The 1925 Illinois Fighting Illini football team was an American football team that represented the University of Illinois during the 1925 Big Ten Conference football season.  In their 13th season under head coach Robert Zuppke, the Illini compiled a 5–3 record and finished in a tie for fifth place in the Big Ten Conference.

This was the final season for hall-of-fame All-American halfback Harold "Red" Grange. Grange was also the team captain.

Schedule

Awards and honors
Red Grange, (Half back)
Consensus All-American, Half back
Chuck Kassel, (End)
All-American, End
Bernie Shively, (Guard)
All-American, Guard

References

Illinois Fighting Illini
Illinois Fighting Illini football seasons
Illinois Fighting Illini football